Aviador Dro, short for El Aviador Dro y sus Obreros Especializados (Aviator Dro and His Specialized Workers), is a synthpop and electronic music band from Spain, formed in Madrid in 1979.

History 
The group was founded by schoolmates Arturo Lanz and Servando Carballar in 1979, when they published an ad in a magazine requesting musicians who liked Throbbing Gristle, Cabaret Voltaire and The Residents to join them.

They were part of the Movida Madrileña. In 1982 they created Dro Records, a Spanish independent label.
Some of their best known songs are: Nuclear, sí (Nuclear, Yes), La televisión es nutritiva (TV is Nutritious), Selector de frecuencias (Frequency Selector) or La zona fantasma (The Phantom Zone)

Quotes
"It is necessary to assimilate the systematized sense of life to be able to be happy" (1979)

"Human beings will disappear. What's more, it is necessary to annihilate them to move on to a mechanical state. In this state, there won't be any individual freedom; only collective freedom will exist. There won't be any problems either, because each man-machine will be properly programmed and we will all be happy." (1979)

Band members 
Biovac N (Servando Carballar): Vocals, synthesizer, programming
Arcoíris (Marta Cervera): Keyboards
ATAT (Ismael Contreras): Keyboards, guitar
CTA 102 (Alejandro Sacristán): Vocals
Genocider/Genocyber F15 (Mario Gil): Keyboards

Discography
Alas sobre el Mundo (1982)
Síntesis (1983)
Tesis (1983)
Cromosomas Salvajes (1985)
Ciudadanos del Imperio (1986)
Ingravidez (1988)
Héroes de los 80 (1990)
Trance (1991)
Cyberiada—Live (1997)
Materia Oscura (1998)
Ópera Científica (1999)
Vano Temporal (1999)
Mecanisburgo (2001)
Ultimátum a la Tierra (2004)
Confía en tus Máquinas (2004)
Candidato Futurista (2007)
Yo, Cyborg (2009)
La voz de la Ciencia (2012)

See also
Spanish Music
Esplendor Geometrico

External links
Official website

References 

Spanish musical groups
Musical groups from Madrid